The 2020 Clemson Tigers baseball team were the varsity intercollegiate baseball team that represented Clemson University during the 2020 NCAA Division I baseball season. The Tigers competed in the Atlantic Coast Conference (ACC) and were led by fifth-year head coach Monte Lee.  Clemson played its home games at Doug Kingsmore Stadium in Clemson, South Carolina.

The season was impacted by the coronavirus pandemic.  On March 12, it was announced that the 2020 NCAA tournament would be canceled due to the pandemic.  Clemson University suspended all events until April 5, 2020. On March 17, the ACC cancelled all spring athletic activities and thereby ended the baseball season. The Tigers finished the season 14–3 and 3–0 in ACC play.

Previous season
In 2019, the Tigers finished the season 4th in the ACC's Atlantic Division with a record of 35–26, 15–15 in conference play. They qualified for the 2019 Atlantic Coast Conference baseball tournament, and were eliminated in pool play. They were invited to the 2019 NCAA Division I baseball tournament, where they played in the Oxford Regional.

Personnel

Roster

Coaching staff

Schedule

Note: All rankings shown are from Collegiate Baseball Poll.

Rankings

2020 MLB draft

References

Clemson Tigers baseball seasons
Clemson
Clemson baseball